The Block NZ is a New Zealand reality television series based on the popular Australian series The Block. The first season premiered on Three on 4 July 2012.

The show is hosted by former New Zealand cricketer Mark Richardson and Shelley Ferguson, while Peter Wolfkamp serves as site foreman. It follows four couples as they compete against each other to completely renovate, room by room, four neighbouring houses in Auckland, and then sell them at auction. Each couple keeps any profit made on the house, and the winner receives a bonus cash sum.

The current main sponsors are paint manufacturer Resene, car manufacturer Suzuki, flooring retailer Flooring Xtra, and fast food chain Subway. Throughout seasons 1–2, car manufacturer Mazda was also a main sponsor, but for season 3, the sponsorship was awarded to car manufacturer Honda. Other previous sponsors include Bunnings Warehouse, BP's Wild Bean Cafe, AMI Insurance and Pita Pit.

The series premiered in Australia on 9Go! on 12 August 2012.

The eleventh series, which was set to air in 2023, will be postponed to 2024 due to a “challenging house market” and the dismal results of the 10th season.

Development
The show was initially announced on 24 February 2012, when a casting call went out and saw over 1,000 couples apply. The four couples selected for the first season were announced on the official Facebook page on 17 June 2012.

Hosts and judges

Series overview

Profits

The combined auction profit excludes the winning prize money

Returning teams

Chloe and Ben originally appeared on the same season, however in separate teams. They returned to season 10 as a team.

Season synopses

Season 1

The first season of The Block NZ premiered on 4 July 2012 and ended on 6 September 2012. It is set in the Auckland suburb of Takapuna.

Season 2

The second season of The Block NZ premiered on 26 August 2013 and ended on 4 November 2013. It is set in the Auckland suburb of Belmont.

Season 3

The third season of The Block NZ premiered on 26 August 2014 and ended on 18 November 2014. It is set in the Auckland suburb of Point Chevalier, the first time the Block was held outside of the North Shore.

Season 4

The fourth season of The Block NZ premiered on 29 September 2015. It is set on the boundary of the Auckland suburbs of Sandringham and Three Kings. The title for the fourth season was The Block NZ: Villa Wars.

Season 5

The fifth season of The Block NZ premiered on 29 May 2016 and is set in the Auckland suburb of Meadowbank. The title of this series is "Girls vs Boys", with two of the teams being made up of females and the other two made up with males. It has netted the highest combined profits of $981,000.

Season 6

The sixth season premiered on 25 June 2017. It is set in the Auckland suburbs of Northcote, North Shore. The title of this series is "Side X Side", as each of the houses were large 4-storey townhouses, the largest houses in terms of floor area in The Block NZ. It had a combined profits ($65,000), and it also saw the first time a house did not meet reserve, but got the highest bid on the re-sell.

Season 7

The seventh season premiered on 8 July 2018. It is set in the Auckland suburb of Hobsonville. The title of this series is "On Point".

Season 8

The eighth season premiered on 17 June 2019. It is set in the Auckland suburb of Kingsland. The title of this series is "Firehouse", as the contestants are renovating apartments in an old fire station.

Season 9

The ninth series premiered on 14 June 2021. It is the second season to be set in the Auckland suburb of Point Chevalier. Production began in 2020 but was paused for 13 months due to the COVID-19 pandemic.

Season 10 

The tenth series of The Block premiered on 18 July 2022. It is set in the Auckland server of Orewa, and features contestants from previous seasons.

The series was won by Chloe & Ben, however it is the current lowest auction to date as they only went over the reserve by $4,000, then Maree & James by only $100, whilst the other two teams homes were passed in and received nothing, making only a combined profit of $4,100. After the auction, TSB New Zealand (sponsor of the series) gifted Quinn and Ben, Maree and James & Stacey and Adam with $10,000 each for the hard work and failing to achieve a profit.

Notes

References

External links

2012 New Zealand television series debuts
English-language television shows
Home renovation television series
New Zealand reality television series
Television shows set in Auckland
Three (TV channel) original programming
New Zealand television series based on Australian television series